Treponema isoptericolens is a spirochaete from the hindgut of the termite Incisitermes tabogae. Its cells are motile, helical in shape, 0.4–0.5 μm in diameter and generally 12–20 μm long; it is obligately anaerobic, with type strain  SPIT5T (=DSM 18056T =JCM 13955T).

References

Further reading
Maier, Raina M., Ian L. Pepper, and Charles P. Gerba, eds. Environmental microbiology. Vol. 397. Academic press, 2009.

External links

LPSN
Type strain of Treponema isoptericolens at BacDive -  the Bacterial Diversity Metadatabase

isoptericolens
Bacteria described in 2008